The FIVB Volleyball Men's World Championship is an international volleyball competition contested by the senior men's national teams of the members of  (FIVB), the sport's global governing body. The initial gap between championships was variable, but since 1962 they have been held every four years. The current champion is Italy, who won their fourth title at the 2022 tournament, defeating Poland in the final.

The current format of the competition involves a qualification phase, which currently takes place over the preceding three years, to determine which teams qualify for the tournament phase, which is often called the World Championship Finals. The former format was 24 teams, including the automatically qualifying host nation(s), compete in the tournament phase for the title at venues within the host nation(s) over a period of about a month.

On 15 October 2022, FIVB announced the expansion of World Championships and the changes to the competition formula. A total of 32 teams are to compete for future editions of the tournament.

The 20 World Championship tournaments have been won by seven different national teams: the Soviet Union six times; Italy four times; Brazil and Poland three times each; Czechoslovakia twice; and East Germany and the United States, once each.

History

Origins
The history of the World Championship goes back to the beginnings of volleyball as a professional, high level sport. One of the first concrete measures taken by the FIVB after its foundation in 1947 was the establishment of an international competition involving teams from more than one continent. In 1949, the first edition was played in Prague, Czechoslovakia. At that point, the tournament was still restricted to Europe.

Three years later, the event was expanded to include nations from Asia, and began to be held in 4-year cycles. By the following edition, there were also teams from South, Central and North America.

Since volleyball was to be added to the Olympic Program in 1964, the 4-cycles were advanced in 2 years after the fourth edition (1960), so that the World Championship may alternate with the Summer Olympic Games. As of 1970, teams from Africa also took part in the competition, and the original goal of having members from all five continental confederations in the games was achieved.

The number of teams involved in the games has changed significantly over the years. Following volleyball's increase in popularity, they raised steadily to over 20 in the 1970s and part of the 1980s, were then cut short to 16 in the 1990s, and finally set up in 24 after 2002. Today, the World Championship is the most comprehensive of all events organized by the FIVB, and arguably the most important, alongside the Olympic Games.

Until 1974, the host nation of the tournament organized both the men's and the women's events, with the single exception of the 1966/1967 games, which took place in different years. Since 1978, this practice has been only occasionally observed, for instance, in 1998 and in the 2006 edition, which was held, as the former was, in Japan.

Winners
The history of the World Championship clearly demonstrates how volleyball was originally dominated by European nations.

The first two editions were won by the Soviet Union. In 1956, twice runner-up Czechoslovakia took the gold. There followed two more consecutive wins for the Soviet Union, in both cases over Czechoslovakia. The Czechs won a gold medal in the 1966 edition.

In 1970, East Germany prevailed over Bulgaria for their first and only title. In 1974, the Soviet Union threatened to take the lead once more, but ended up being defeated by Poland at the final. Nevertheless, they would confirm their leadership by winning, for the third time, two editions in a row.

1986 saw the first relevant confrontation between United States, the rising major force of the decade, and the traditional leader Soviet Union after the Olympic boycotts of 1980 and 1984. As would be the case two years later at the Seoul Olympic Games, the issue was settled in favour of the Americans led by Karch Kiraly and Steve Timmons. Italy completely dominated the competition in the 1990s, winning all the editions that took place in this decade (1990, 1994, 1998), led by such players as Lorenzo Bernardi and Andrea Giani.

In the 2000s, Brazil became the leading force in the sport, also winning three consecutive editions (2002, 2006 and 2010), the first of which in Buenos Aires, Argentina, the same stage where the Brazilians had been runners-up in 1982. In 2014, hosts Poland defeated Brazil in four sets at the final, achieving their second gold medal and preventing what would have been a historic fourth title in a row. In 2018, Poland won a second consecutive title, again defeating Brazil in the final. In 2022, Poland, playing at home, missed the opportunity to win three consecutive editions by losing in the final to Italy, who won their fourth World title.

As of 2022, 20 editions of the men's Volleyball World Championship have been played: 16 went to European teams, and four to American teams (three times to Brazil and once to the United States).

Competition formula

Qualification
See also pages in category FIVB Volleyball World Championship qualification.

Previous qualification

New qualification

Final tournament
The competition formula of the FIVB World Championship has been constantly changed to fit the different number of teams that participate in each edition. The following rules usually apply:

 Twenty-four teams participate in each event. 
 Qualification procedures for the World Championship are long and strenuous, lasting over two years. 
 Host nations are always pre-qualified.
 The number of spots available per confederation is determined by the FIVB: Europe has usually the highest, and Africa or South America the lowest.
 To participate in the event, a team must survive a number of qualification tournaments depending on its position in the FIVB World Rankings. Low-ranked teams may have to engage in up to three tournaments to be granted a berth; high-ranked teams typically play only one.
 The competition is divided in at least two phases: a preliminary round and a final round. Depending on the number of participating teams, one or more intermediary rounds may also be required.
 In the preliminary round, teams are organized in pools. Each team plays one match against all other teams in its pool. 
 When all the matches of the preliminary round have been played, the top n teams in each pool qualify for the following round(s), and the remaining ones leave the competition.  The value of n depends on the number of participating teams and the format that will be employed in the finals.
 The FIVB has tried various different formats for the final round(s). For some years now (2004), there seems to be a  consensus that at least semifinals and finals must be played according to the Olympic format. 
 Quarterfinals may consist of groups of teams playing against each other, or of direct confrontation; in the latter case additional intermediary rounds might be required to reduce the number of surviving teams to eight.
 The tournament now implements a line-up of fourteen players, and four reserve players in case of injuries.

New formula
A totally brand new competition formula was announced by FIVB. A total of 32 teams will compete in the World Championship. The teams will be divided into 8 groups of 4 teams for the round-robin phase with 2 best teams per group moving into the direct knockout phase: round of 16, quarterfinals, semi-finals and final.

Results summary

Medals summary

Hosts
List of hosts by number of championships hosted.

* = co-hosts.

MVP by edition
1949–66 – Not awarded 
1970 – 
1974 – 
1978 – Not awarded
1982 – 
1986 – 
1990 – 
1994 – 
1998 – 
2002 – 
2006 – 
2010 – 
2014 – 
2018 – 
2022 –

Most successful players

Boldface denotes active volleyball players and highest medal count among all players (including these who not included in these tables) per type.

Multiple gold medalists

Multiple medalists
The table shows players who have won at least 4 medals in total at the World Championships.

See also

Volleyball at the Summer Olympics
FIVB Volleyball Women's World Championship
FIVB Volleyball Men's World Cup
FIVB Volleyball World Grand Champions Cup
FIVB Volleyball World League
FIVB Volleyball Men's Nations League
FIVB Volleyball Men's U23 World Championship
FIVB Volleyball Men's U21 World Championship
FIVB Volleyball Boys' U19 World Championship
List of Indoor Volleyball World Medalists

References

External links

 
Volleyball World Championship History

 
 
V
International men's volleyball competitions
Men's
Quadrennial sporting events